Keith A. Hall is an American lawyer. He is a graduate of Centre College in Danville, Kentucky and has his law degree from the University of Louisville. He has served on the University of Louisville Board of Overseers and is a benefactor to the university's athletic programs.

Hall was a Senior Vice President and Deputy General Counsel for Insight Communications prior to the company's acquisition by Time Warner Cable.

He served as a presidential elector in the 2004 United States presidential election.

Hall served in several high-level posts in the administration of Kentucky Governor Ernie Fletcher (R) and served as the Deputy Chair of gubernatorial transition under Mike Duncan, former Republican National Committee chairman and current Chairman of American Crossroads. Hall served as Kentucky's Director of Homeland Security in 2005.

In January 2006, Hall was a named defendant in the case of  Linda Wells Back v. Commonwealth of Kentucky. This case alleged that Hall and three other individuals violated Back's constitutional right of free speech and freedom of association during the Fletcher administration. Judge Amul Thapar of the United States District Judge for the Eastern District of Kentucky dismissed Hall as a defendant in 2009, citing the absence of any evidence of wrongdoing. The United States Court of Appeals for the Sixth Circuit affirmed Thapar's ruling in 2010 and in 2012, Thapar confirmed that Hall was no longer a defendant in the case.

Hall was one of the senior shareholders in Insight Communications at the time of Time Warner Cable's $3 billion acquisition on February 29, 2012. He garnered a windfall of millions of dollars from the company's sale which allowed him to depart at the time of closing.

During Hall's service as a senior officer in Insight Communications he successfully defended the company against an antitrust suit by rival Knology. and had a Kentucky state tax declared unconstitutional. Insight CEO Michael Willner promoted Hall to be Insight's deputy general counsel in 2009 to serve in an expanded role.

He has made over $37,450 in contributions to candidates for federal office and $13,087 to candidates for state office in Kentucky.

References

Year of birth missing (living people)
Living people
Kentucky Republicans
2004 United States presidential electors
Centre College alumni
University of Louisville School of Law alumni